Christopher Rodolfo Ramírez Ulrich (born 8 January 1994) is a Guatemalan footballer who plays as a midfielder.

He made his debut for the full Guatemalan team against Mexico on 1 October 2020.

International career

International goals
Scores and results list Guatemala's goal tally first.

References

External links
 
 

1994 births
Living people
Guatemalan footballers
Guatemala international footballers
Association football midfielders
C.D. Guastatoya players
Antigua GFC players
Deportivo Sanarate F.C. players
Liga Nacional de Fútbol de Guatemala players